Karolinum (formerly Latin: Collegium Carolinum, in Czech Karlova kolej) is a complex of buildings located in the Old Town of the City of Prague. Karolinum, the seat of the Charles University, is one of the oldest dormitories situated in Central Europe. The dormitory was named after the Emperor Charles IV.

History 
Shortly after the establishment of Charles University in 1348, the young institution encountered several organizational problems. One of the major complications was the lack of lecture and accommodation rooms for teachers and students. Emperor Charles IV, apparently inspired by the organization of the Sorbonne college in Paris and by the newly founded universities in Kraków (1364) and Vienna (1365), decided to donate to the school a new college. In 1366, the university received the house of the Jew Lazar, located in the Prague's Old Town. However, the school was donated really representative rooms only in the early 1380s by Wenceslaus, the son of Charles IV. For this purpose, Wenceslaus chose a residence of the wealthy German merchant Johlin (Jan) Rotlev. Rotlev's son Martin (who financed the second oldest German translation of Bible) was closely linked with the court and supported the reformist tendencies of the university. Though it is known that Martin Rotlev inherited the palace, the way by which it passed into the possession of the university remains unknown. The coat of arms of the Rotlev family is a part of the decoration of an oriel window of the college. In addition to the Rotlev Palace, King Wenceslaus also bought the surrounding buildings and rebuilt them for the purposes of the school.

The architectural shape of Karolinum changed significantly during its history. In the early 18th century, it was rebuilt in Baroque style, according to the plans of the architect František Maxmilián Kaňka. However, the reconstruction was only provisional and the structural condition of the building in the following decades was very bad. In 1786, during a visit in Karolinum, the Emperor Josef II expressed his dissatisfaction with the state of the "seat of muses". It was even planned to sell the building, but in 1802 it was decided that Karolinum would remain in the hands of the Charles University. The decision was apparently influenced by renewed romantic and patriotic enthusiasm, (regarding the historical building as a significant monument for education in Bohemia). From 1879 to 1881, several parts of the building were rebuilt in the Neo-Gothic style by the architect Josef Mocker.

Following the World War I and the establishment of the Czechoslovak state, the buildings of Karolinum remained a property of the Charles University. Karolinum is a National Cultural Monument of the Czech Republic.

The official publishing house of Charles University is named Karolinum.

Gallery

Notes

References

External links 

 Karolinum – historické sídlo Univerzity Karlovy (Charles University, official website) 

Buildings and structures in Prague
Charles University
National Cultural Monuments of the Czech Republic